Yeshaayahu Toma Ŝik (pronounced "shick") (Schück Tamás, Schuck Tamas) (17 August 1939 – 13 July 2004) was a Hungarian-Israeli peace activist, anarchist, libertarian socialist, vegan, world citizen, and pioneer of the Israeli-Palestinian search for peace.

Since he was a teenager and as a survivor of the Holocaust, Toma Sik actively opposed Israeli militarism. He refused military service and counselled conscientious objectors for 30 years, and played a central role in the War Resisters International chapter in Israel, as well as in Gush Shalom (Peace Bloc).

He was an active secular humanist proponent for human and civil rights for both Jews and Arabs. He worked as a columnist and translator at Al-Fajr English-language Palestinian weekly, and as a photographer for the Arab Studies Society in East Jerusalem. Since 1974 he devoted himself merely to public activity, developing a simple living style. He was a familiar sight at demonstrations in central Israel for many years, where he would distribute leaflets written in his peculiar style.

He also worked at the War Resisters International’s headquarters in London, was the central activist in Amnesty International Israel Branch and helped Alba Kör (Hungarian nonviolent movement for Peace) become a War Resisters International Member. He was also a citizen of the Mondcivitan Republic (Commonwealth of World Citizens).

For many years Toma Sik supported the international language Esperanto. He also taught it to his children. He occasionally hosted Esperanto meetings in his Tel Aviv home and hosted foreign Esperantists there.

He left Israel in the late 1990s and ultimately settled down again in his country of birth, Hungary, where he died in 2004, overrun by a tractor during a nightly walk home through the fields to his newly-bought old farm where he was trying to establish an egalitarian agricultural commune of organic, humanist and vegan "new peasants". In his obituary his friends stated: "in the words of Joe Hill, Don't mourn, organise!".

The International Institute of Social History keeps a vast collection of papers from Toma Sik in several languages, such as Hebrew, Hungarian, and English. The papers include documentation on the peace movement in Israel and especially Gush Shalom, periodicals and leaflets about sustainable and organic agriculture, the environment (e.g. in Eastern Europe), vegetarianism and veganism, and documentation about European unification, including newsletters from the European Anti-Maastricht Alliance.

See also
 List of peace activists

References

External links
 Toma Sik's text "Puzzles of a Lifetime" at the War Resisters International's site
 A short biography at Libcom's site
 About Toma's papers at the International Institute of Social History
  by Uri Davis
 Audio portrait

1939 births
2004 deaths
Israeli anarchists
Israeli anti-war activists
Israeli conscientious objectors
Israeli Esperantists
Israeli humanists
Israeli pacifists
Israeli people of Hungarian-Jewish descent
Libertarian socialists
Secular humanists